Gnathophis andriashevi is an eel in the family Congridae (conger/garden eels). It was described by Emma Stanislavovna Karmovskaya in 1990. It is a marine, deep water-dwelling eel which is known from the western part of the Sala y Gomez Ridge, in the southeastern Pacific Ocean. It dwells at a depth range of 260–330 metres.

The species epithet "andriashevi" was given in honour of Anatoly Andriyashev's 80th birthday.

References

andriashevi
Fish described in 1990